Justino Díaz (born January 29, 1940) is a Puerto Rican operatic bass-baritone. In 1963, Díaz won an annual contest held at the Metropolitan Opera of New York, becoming the first Puerto Rican to obtain such an honor and as a consequence, made his Metropolitan debut in October 1963 in Verdi's Rigoletto as Monterone.

Early years
Díaz was born in San Juan, Puerto Rico, the capital of the island, but lived and was raised in the town of Cataño. He attended Robinson Elementary School where, at the age of 8, he started to participate in the school's activities as a singer. In his first school play, when he was 10 years old, he sang the song "Old Black Joe", which became his favorite. After finishing his primary education, Díaz attended the University of Puerto Rico High School in Río Piedras. While in high school, he took singing classes and participated in various presentations around the island.

Díaz joined the choir of the University of Puerto Rico, under the direction of Augusto Rodríguez, where he sang solo. His operatic debut was in 1957 as Ben in Gian Carlo Menotti's The Telephone, or L'Amour à trois. It wasn't long before Díaz enrolled in New England Conservatory in Massachusetts. One of his professors was Boris Goldovsky, who would be very influential in his career. Díaz made his professional debut as an opera singer at the Opera Theater of New England. In 1960, Goldovsky asked Díaz to join his opera company on a 20-state tour. After the tour, he entered and participated in a competition celebrated at the Metropolitan Opera House, winning third place in the New England region.

Díaz moved to New York upon finishing his studies at the conservatory. Goldovsky recommended that he be represented by Hans J. Hoffman, a talent agent. Soon, Díaz was singing alongside other artists at the American Opera Society. He also sang with the Rochester Philharmonic Orchestra and the Boston Symphony Orchestra.

Metropolitan Opera

On March 29, 1963, Díaz won the Metropolitan Opera National Council Auditions, becoming the first Puerto Rican to obtain such an honor. As a consequence, Díaz made his Metropolitan debut in October 1963 in Verdi's Rigoletto as Monterone. He went on to sing 400 performances in 28 roles at the Metropolitan Opera, his final appearance there being Baron Scarpia in Tosca, in 1994.

Among the opera houses in which Díaz has performed are: Paris Opera, The Vienna Staatsoper; the Opera House of Salzburg; the Opera of Spoleto; the Opera of Rome; The Royal Opera House in Covent Garden; the Teatro Colón in Buenos Aires; the Zarzuela Theater of Madrid, Barcelona's Gran Teatre del Liceu and others. In 1966 he helped to inaugurate the Lincoln Center in New York City by starring opposite Leontyne Price in the opening night performance of Antony and Cleopatra by Samuel Barber.

The bass-baritone was seen at La Scala in two operas of Rossini, L'assedio di Corinto (with Beverly Sills and Marilyn Horne, 1969) and La pietra del paragone (at the Piccola Scala Arturo Toscanini, 1983 and 1983).  He first appeared at the New York City Opera in Ginastera's dodecaphonic Beatrix Cenci, opposite Arlene Saunders, in 1973.

In Puerto Rico
In Puerto Rico, Díaz was a frequent participant in the annual Casals Festival. He sang in the inauguration of the Luis A. Ferre Performing Arts Center in San Juan. He also played the role of Luis Muñoz Marín in the 1984 musical Fela. In 1986, Díaz played the role of Iago, opposite Plácido Domingo in Franco Zeffirelli's film adaptation of Otello. In 1967, his Escamillo in Carmen was filmed, conducted and directed by Herbert von Karajan, and also starring Grace Bumbry and Jon Vickers.

Díaz recorded Messiah, Semele and Solomon by Handel.  He also recorded Lucia di Lammermoor, L'assedio di Corinto (both with Sills) and Thaïs (with Anna Moffo), as well as an album of arias of Mozart. He has also sung the role of Emile de Becque in the world-premiere recording of the complete score from Rodgers and Hammerstein's South Pacific. He stars in this British-produced 2-CD set opposite Paige O'Hara as Nellie Forbush. In 1987, Diaz played the role onstage at Lincoln Center.

Recognitions and awards
Among the recognitions and awards which Díaz has been honored with are: An Honorary Doctorate in Music from the New England Conservatory, Handel Medallion from the City of New York and The National Medal of Culture from the Institute of Puerto Rican Culture. On 20 July 2021, it was announced that Diaz would be among the five honorees at the annual Kennedy Center Honors gala.

Repertoire

Filmography
Among the films and television appearances made by Díaz are the following:
Callas Forever - 2002 - as Scarpia
"When the Fire Burns: The Life and Music of Manuel de Falla - 1991 - as "Don Quixote" (in El Retablo de Maese Pedro)
... aka "Life and Death of Manuel de Falla" (USA)
... aka "The Life and Music of Manuel de Falla" (USA: short title)
Otello - 1986 - as Iago
Carmen - 1967 - as Escamillo

Television appearances
1977 - Sparafucile in a Metropolitan Opera Rigoletto
1981 - Oroveso in Norma
1988 - Nélusko in L'africaine
1991 - Iago in Act 3 of Otello in The Metropolitan Opera Gala 1991
1992 - Don Quixote in El Retablo de Maese Pedro
1995 - Juanillo in El Gato Montés El

Later years
On March 29, 2003, Díaz retired after 48 years in opera. However, before he made his last presentation at the Luis A. Ferre Performing Arts Center, he sang for the last time in public with his University of Puerto Rico alumni chorus the song "Old Black Joe", the same song that he sang at the Robinson Elementary School when he was 8 years old, Díaz and fellow Puerto Rican pianist Elías López-Sobá were, from 2003 to 2009, the artistic and musical directors of the Casals Festival, a classical music event held annually in San Juan, Puerto Rico.

Justino Diaz is married to Ilsa Rodriguez. He has two daughters by a previous marriage: Helen Hayes Award-winning stage and screen actress Natascia Diaz and dancer/composer Katya Diaz.

See also

List of Puerto Ricans

References

External links
Popular Culture
A tribute to Justino Diaz

1940 births
Living people
People from San Juan, Puerto Rico
Operatic bass-baritones
Puerto Rican opera singers
New England Conservatory alumni
Winners of the Metropolitan Opera National Council Auditions
Kennedy Center honorees